Montague Cholmeley may refer to:

Sir Montague Cholmeley, 1st Baronet (1772–1831), British MP for Grantham 1820–1826
Sir Montague Cholmeley, 2nd Baronet (1802–1874), British MP for Grantham 1826–1831 and North Lincolnshire
Sir Montagu Aubrey Rowley Cholmeley, 4th Baronet (1876–1914), of the Cholmeley baronets
Sir Montague John Cholmeley, 6th Baronet (1935–1998), of the Cholmeley baronets

See also
 Cholmeley (surname)